The United States competed at the 2019 World Aquatics Championships in Gwangju, South Korea from 12 to 28 July.

Medalists

Artistic swimming

Women

Mixed

Diving

Men

Women

Mixed

High diving

Men

Women

Open water swimming

The United States qualified four male and five female open water swimmers.

Men

Women

Mixed

Swimming

Men

Women

Mixed

 Legend: (*) = Swimmers who participated in the heat only.

Water polo

Men's tournament

Team roster

Alex Wolf
Johnny Hooper
Marko Vavic
Alex Obert
Ben Hallock
Luca Cupido
Hannes Daube
Matthew Farmer
Alex Bowen
Chancellor Ramirez
Jesse Smith (C)
Max Irving
Drew Holland
Coach: Dejan Udovičić

Group play

Playoffs

9th–12th place semifinals

9th place game

Women's tournament

Team roster

Amanda Longan
Maddie Musselman
Melissa Seidemann
Rachel Fattal
Paige Hauschild
Margaret Steffens (C)
Stephania Haralabidis
Kiley Neushul
Aria Fischer
Kaleigh Gilchrist
Makenzie Fischer
Alys Williams
Ashleigh Johnson
Coach: Adam Krikorian

Group play

QuarterfinalsSemifinalsGold medal final

References

World Aquatics Championships
Nations at the 2019 World Aquatics Championships
2019